"I Swear" is a 1994 song by John Michael Montgomery, covered by All-4-One, Kenny Rogers and Gary Baker.

I Swear may also refer to:
 I Swear (album), album by  Inhale Exhale  2008
 "I Swear" (N-Dubz song), by N-Dubz 2006
 "I Swear" (Ice Prince song), by Ice Prince 2013
 "I Swear", a 2016 song by Wyclef Jean from the EP J'ouvert

See also
 Swear (disambiguation)